Wesco is the name of several companies in the United States:

 WESCO International, an electrical distribution company based in Pittsburgh, Pennsylvania
 Wesco Financial, a diversified financial corporation based in Pasadena, California
 West Coast Shoe Company, maker of Wesco work boots, based in Scappoose, Oregon
 WESCO oil, an oil company in West Michigan

It also refers to Wesco in Germany (formerly Westermann & Co), founded 1867.